Parliamentary elections were held in Togo on 24 March 1985. The country was a one-party state at the time, with the Rally of the Togolese People as the sole legal party. Unlike the previous election in 1979 when a single list of candidates was presented to voters for approval, this election was contested by 216 candidates running for 77 seats and 22 reserve members. Voter turnout was reported to be 78.6%.

Results

References

Togo
1985 in Togo
Elections in Togo
One-party elections
March 1985 events in Africa